Castenedia is a monotypic, genus of flowering plants in the daisy family, Asteraceae. It contains a single species, Castenedia santamartensis. It is native to Colombia.

Both the genus and the species were circumscribed by Robert Merrill King and Harold Ernest Robinson in Phytologia vol.39 on page 58 in 1978.

The genus name of Castenedia is in honour of Rafael Romero Castañeda (1910–1973), who was a Colombian botanist and plant collector.

References

Monotypic Asteraceae genera
Eupatorieae
Flora of Colombia